The 2018–19 CEV Cup was the 47th edition of the European CEV Cup volleyball club tournament.

Participating teams 
The number of participants on the basis of ranking list for European Cup Competitions:

Main Phase

32nd Finals 

|}

First leg 

|}

Second leg 

|}

16th Finals 

|}

First leg 

|}

Second leg 

|}

8th Finals 

|}

1Both matches have been played in Trento, Italy.

First leg 

|}

Second leg 

|}

4th Finals 

|}

First leg 

|}

Second leg 

|}

Final Phase

Semifinals 

|}

First leg 

|}

Second leg 

|}

Finals 

|}

First leg 

|}

Second leg 

|}

References

External links 
 Official site

CEV Cup
CEV Cup
CEV Cup